Aodh Mac Dónaill (Anglicized: Hugh McDonnell) was a scribe from County Meath. Among the works he transcribed was Seachrán Chairn tSiadhail by Tarlach Rua Mac Dónaill. It is now contained in a manuscript house in the Public Library, Belfast.

References
 Diarmaid Ó Doibhlin (2000) Tyrone's Gaelic Literary Legacy, in Tyrone:History and Society, p. 421.

Irish scribes
People from County Meath
18th-century Irish writers
Irish-language writers